Melanohalea davidii is a species of foliose lichen in the family Parmeliaceae. It was described as a new species in 2016. The type was collected by Ana Crespo in the Sierra de Grazalema Natural Park in the province of Cádiz, Spain, where it was found growing on cluster pine. In addition to the type locality, it has also been recorded from Selas in the province of Guadalajara. The specific epithet davidii honours lichenologist David Leslie Hawksworth. The lichen is morphologically similar to Melanohalea exasperata, but is genetically distinct from that species.

References

davidii
Lichen species
Lichens described in 2016
Lichens of Southwestern Europe
Taxa named by Ana Crespo
Taxa named by Helge Thorsten Lumbsch
Taxa named by Pradeep Kumar Divakar